KNET (1450 AM) is a terrestrial American radio station, relayed by an FM translator, and broadcasting a classic hits format, primarily focused on the decades of the 1980s and 1990s. Licensed to Palestine, Texas, United States, the station is currently owned by Tiffany and Kristi Spearman through licensee Zula Com, LLC.

Translator

History
The station was assigned the call letters KYYK on July 1, 1987. On September 21, 1987, the station changed its call sign to the current KNET.

On April 6, 2022, KNET flipped its format from news/talk to classic hits.

References

External links

NET
Radio stations established in 1936
Classic hits radio stations in the United States
1936 establishments in Texas